Henry Robert Emmerson,  (September 25, 1853 – July 9, 1914) was a New Brunswick lawyer, businessman, politician, and philanthropist.

Henry Emmerson was educated at Amherst Academy, Mount Allison Academy, St. Joseph's College, Acadia College and earned a law degree from Boston University. He went on to a lucrative law practice and was heavily involved in business. He was involved in  woollen manufacturing, was a director of the Maritime Baptist Publishing Company Limited, president of the New Brunswick Petroleum Company Limited, the Acadia Coal and Coke Company, and the Sterling Coal Company, as well as a director of the Record Foundry and Machine Company.

He attempted to win a seat in the House of Commons of Canada in 1887 but was unsuccessful. The next year he was elected to the provincial legislature then after the win was contested by his opponent and a new election contest ordered in 1889, Emmerson won the seat. In 1891 he was appointed to the Legislative Council of the province and oversaw its abolition. He re-entered the House of Assembly and in October 1892 was appointed to the Executive Council, serving as Chief Commissioner of Public Works in the Liberal government of Premier Andrew George Blair.

As commissioner, Emmerson stopped the practice of building bridges out of wood and opted for more permanent, and more expensive, materials thus driving up the province's public debt. He also supported women's suffrage.

Emmerson became Premier in 1897. During his tenure, he briefly held the position of Attorney-General. His government tried to promote tourism and wheat farming and the development of natural gas and petroleum in the province. In 1899, he introduced legislation to grant women the right to vote but in a free vote, the bill was defeated.

Emmerson left provincial politics in 1900 to become a Liberal MP in the House of Commons of Canada. From 1904 to 1907 he was Minister of Railways and Canals in the federal cabinet of Sir Wilfrid Laurier.

Although he was regarded as brilliant, capable, and personable, his alcoholism and reputation as a womanizer hampered his career. In 1906, an exasperated Laurier had Emmerson sign a pledge that he  would "never . . . again taste wine, beer or any other mixed or intoxicating liquor" and that he would provide the prime minister with an undated and signed letter of resignation to be used should he fail in his promise. The letter of resignation was invoked in 1907 after The Daily Gleaner newspaper reported that Emmerson was thrown out of a Montreal hotel with "two women of ill repute". He denied the allegations but on April 1 submitted his resignation from Cabinet, which Laurier accepted. Emmerson filed an unsuccessful lawsuit against the Daily Gleaner for defamation and libel.

Henry Emerson remained a member of parliament for another seven years until his death in 1914.
In his later years, Emmerson donated the money to build a new library, named Emmerson Hall, at Acadia University in honour of his father, the Rev. Robert Henry Emmerson.

His son, Henry Read Emmerson, was also elected to the Canadian House of Commons and was appointed to the Senate of Canada. His great great grandson was Chris Cornell, lead singer of Soundgarden. His great great great grandson is professional ice hockey player Noah Dobson.

Electoral record 

By-election: on Mr. Emmerson being appointed Minister of Railways and Canals:

|- 
  
|Liberal
|Henry Emmerson
|align="right"|acclaimed

References

 
 
 Biography, Government of New Brunswick

1853 births
1914 deaths
Acadia University alumni
Boston University School of Law alumni
Canadian Baptists
Canadian Ministers of Railways and Canals
Liberal Party of Canada MPs
Members of the House of Commons of Canada from New Brunswick
Members of the King's Privy Council for Canada
Mount Allison University alumni
Businesspeople from New Brunswick
Lawyers in New Brunswick
People from Sunbury County, New Brunswick
Premiers of New Brunswick
St. Joseph's College alumni
19th-century Baptists
19th-century Canadian philanthropists